Haystack Mountain School of Crafts, commonly called "Haystack," is a craft school located at 89 Haystack School Drive on the coast of Deer Isle, Maine.

History 
Haystack was founded in 1950 by a group of craft artists in the Belfast, Maine area, with support from Mary Beasom Bishop. The first director of Haystack was Francis Sumner Merritt, whose wife Priscilla Merritt was also an administrator. It took its name from its original location near Haystack Mountain, in Montville, Maine.The school was located in Montville/Liberty, Maine through 1960, but when it became clear that it needed to move, Mary B. Bishop asked one of its trustees, artist William H. Muir to find a place to move to the Maine coast. Muir and his wife Emily found a property on Deer Isle, which Bishop purchased to facilitate building a permanent location.  In 1961 the school was moved to its current campus on Deer Isle.

The campus and buildings were designed by architect Edward Larrabee Barnes, and consists of 34 buildings clustered onto  of the more than  campus property, located on Stinson's Neck, an appendage extending southeast from the main part of the island of Deer Isle.  The buildings were designed by Barnes to fit well within their environment, and to provide views of the surrounding land- and seascape.  In 1994, the school campus won the "Twenty-five Year Award" from the American Institute of Architects.  The award is given to a structure (or in this case, several structures) whose construction and original intent have withstood the test of time. The school was honored again in 2005 when the campus was added to the National Register of Historic Places.

Since 2004, the school has published a quarterly newspaper, Haystack Gateway. In 2016, Craft in America included Haystack in its list of significant craft places in America.

In 2019, curators Rachael Arauz and Diana Greenwold organized In the Vanguard: Haystack Mountain School of Crafts 1950-1969, a major exhibition and scholarly catalogue addressing the school's early history.

About 
Haystack offers summer workshops of one to three weeks in blacksmithing, clay, fibers, glass, graphics, metals, and wood. The school has no permanent faculty; the workshops are taught by visiting professors and artists from around the United States. Since 2012, Haystack has operated an annual two-week artist residency (supported by funding from the Windgate Charitable Foundation) during which artists may move among studios and receive technical assistance.  Haystack does not award academic degrees.

In addition to offering traditional tools and facilities for crafts, Haystack is a member of MIT's Fab Lab network.

See also
National Register of Historic Places listings in Hancock County, Maine
Fab Lab

References

External links
 Haystack Web Site

Art schools in Maine
Schools in Hancock County, Maine
Crafts educators
Maine culture
National Register of Historic Places in Hancock County, Maine
School buildings on the National Register of Historic Places in Maine
Educational institutions established in 1950
1950 establishments in Maine
Edward Larrabee Barnes buildings
Deer Isle, Maine